Associazione Sportiva Dilettantistica Portogruaro Calcio (usually referred to as Portogruaro) is an Italian association football club, based in Portogruaro, Veneto. Currently it plays in Serie D.

History

Calcio Portogruaro-Summaga

Foundation
The club was founded in 1990 as Calcio Portogruaro-Summaga and also known as Portosummaga after the merger of then-Promozione clubs Associazione Calcio Portogruaro (founded in 1919 in the city of Portogruaro) and Associazione Calcio Summaga (from Summaga, a frazione of Portogruaro itself).

From 2007 to 2013
In the Serie C2 2007-08 regular season, Portosummaga finished third in Girone B, and qualified for the promotional playoffs. The team defeated fourth-placed SPAL in the semi-finals, because it was the higher classified team after the pair ended in 4–4 aggregate tie. In the finals, it defeated second-placed Bassano Virtus 5–3 on aggregate to win promotion to, the then-called Lega Pro Prima Divisione for the 2008–09 season.

On 9 May 2010, under the tenure of former Serie A defender Alessandro Calori, the club defeated Verona on the final matchday to gain promotion to the Serie B, and they therefore marked their first appearance in the Italian second tier in the 2010–11 season.
However, the club was relegated to Lega Pro Prima Divisione after only a single season in Serie B, finishing 21st.
In the 2012–13 season the club was relegated to Lega Pro Seconda Divisione.

A.S.D. Portogruaro
The club was refounded with the current name in the summer 2013 restarting from Promozione. In 2019 the local entrepreneur Andrea Bertolini bought the club, at the end of the season the team obtained the promotion to Eccellenza Veneto without ever losing a game.

Colors and badge
The team's colors are dark-red and black.

Current squad
Updated 1 February 2014.

Out on loan

Honours
 2 Campionati di Promozione 1992/1993, 2018/2019
 2 Campionati di Eccellenza 1995/1996, 1997/1998
 1 Campionato di Serie D 2003/2004
 1 Campionato di Prima Divisione 2009/2010
 1 Coppa Disciplina 2009/2010

References

External links
Official site

Football clubs in Italy
Football clubs in Veneto
Association football clubs established in 1990
Serie B clubs
Serie C clubs
Serie D clubs
Eccellenza
Promozione
1990 establishments in Italy
Phoenix clubs (association football)
2013 establishments in Italy